Mommy Dead and Dearest is a 2017 American documentary film directed by Erin Lee Carr about the murder of Dee Dee Blanchard, for which her daughter, Gypsy Rose Blanchard, and Gypsy's boyfriend, Nicholas Godejohn, pled guilty and were convicted, respectively. It debuted on HBO on May 16, 2017.

The documentary explores both the murder and its aftermath but also focuses on the years of abuse that Gypsy suffered at the hands of her mother, who convinced many that Gypsy suffered from a variety of illnesses. ; Godejohn eventually received a life sentence for first-degree murder and armed criminal action.

 The documentary also revealed the extent of the lies Dee Dee told about Gypsy's health such as the fact that she could not walk and that she had an unnecessary feeding tube fitted.

References

External links
 Mommy Dead and Dearest information on HBO.com
 
 
 

2017 films
2017 television films
Documentary films about crime in the United States
Films directed by Erin Lee Carr
HBO documentary films
2010s American films